Ballajura is a suburb of Perth, Western Australia, in the City of Swan local government area.  Ballajura is located 14 km north of the Perth CBD. The postcode for the suburb is 6066.

History
The Ballajura area was first settled in 1905, when Ernest Maltby Kerruish, an immigrant from the Isle of Man, purchased land for a farm at the present site, which at the time was located in Caversham.  He named it Ballajora, after a farm at Maughold on the Isle of Man.  John Creer and Arthur Eaton, who also emigrated with Kerruish from the Isle of Man, joined him in clearing the land to build a house and begin farming the land.  After a few years, Kerruish decided the soil was not fertile enough and moved his operations to an established vineyard in the present-day Caversham area, a few kilometres southeast.

The names Kerruish, Eaton, and Creer have been given to three of the four houses of Ballajura Primary School.  The fourth is named after Matilda Bennett, a woman also of Manx descent who was the wife of John Septimus Roe, the first surveyor general of Western Australia under the first governor of the state, Sir James Stirling.  Bennett Brook, a stream which ran through the Ballajora farm, was also named after Matilda Bennett.

The suburb was further developed in the 1980s with the development of two sub-divisions of Lakeshore and the Lakes Estate both becoming sought-after locations.
Built around lakes and parks, they attracted a high quality of homes with the median price of housing within the subdivisions attracting prices 75-100% higher than of the rest of Ballajura.
A proposal to officially rename the subdivisions was opposed by members of the local council, who expressed concerns that it would impact negatively on the remaining areas of Ballajura.

Community
Australian-born residents accounted for 59% of the population.

The suburb has four primary schools (Ballajura, South Ballajura, Illawarra, and Mary MacKillop Catholic Primary School) and one high school (Ballajura Community College (BCC)).  No railway line currently serves the Ballajura area, though the suburb has several local bus services straight to the city and will be served by the Malaga railway station as part of the future Morley–Ellenbrook line, beginning in 2024.

Notes

References
 Illawarra Primary School
 South Ballajura Primary School
 

Suburbs of Perth, Western Australia
Suburbs and localities in the City of Swan